The 2008 Maine Republican presidential caucuses were held on February 1, February 2, and February 3 at various locations throughout the state of Maine. The results were used to apportion 21 delegates for the state.  The Maine Republican caucuses were the first caucuses in the 2008 election season in which Rudy Giuliani was out of the race.

Process

The Maine Republican caucus is a modified closed caucus. New voters and voters who have not declared a party may register as Republicans 30 minutes before the caucus begins. Otherwise, a voter must have been registered Republican 15 days before the caucus. In addition, those who turn 18 by the general election are eligible to register at the caucus site.  The delegates chosen at the caucuses are actually non-binding; this means that they will not be bound to any specific candidate.

Like most Republican Party caucuses, there are two components to the Maine caucuses. First, delegates are elected from the attendees. These delegates later represent the caucusgoers at the state convention in May. Candidates generally provide slates of delegates to voters who are interested in supporting them, and voters can ask prospective delegates whom they support for president. A total of 3,867 delegates were selected statewide in 2008. Then, a straw poll, called a presidential preference ballot, is taken of the individuals in the room. The results of this secret ballot are transmitted to the media, who use it as a "snapshot" of the opinions of Maine Republicans. Although the media report the results of the ballot, and assign delegates appropriately, it is the state convention which determines who actually goes to the Republican National Convention. Even after the state convention, all delegates remain unbound to any candidate.

In 2008, although some caucuses were held on February 3, this was the day of Super Bowl XLII and county parties were discouraged from holding caucuses for fear of low turnout. Only three caucuses were scheduled for that day. Thus, the party released results statewide for the media on the evening of February 2.

Campaign

Since Maine is adjacent to New Hampshire, Mainers have the benefit of traveling to New Hampshire to look at the candidates, and spillover coverage from the New Hampshire primary, traditionally the first primary election of the nominating process. Some candidates traveled to Maine during the 2008 campaign on visits to New Hampshire. Rudy Giuliani visited the state in September, 2007. Many candidates mobilized supporters. Further visits to the state were expected to be few, given that the Maine caucuses were sandwiched between the prominent Florida primary and Super Tuesday. However, Ron Paul visited the state in the end of January, five days before the caucuses.

By the time of the caucus, Ron Paul was the only presidential candidate still in the race who had visited Maine to campaign, but Mitt Romney's oldest son, Tagg, campaigned for him there.

Some residents have criticized the caucus system, complaining that it disenfranchises the elderly and military service-members and discourages turnout.

Results
Maine 2008 Presidential Preference Survey Results:

* Candidate dropped out of the race before the caucuses

See also
 2008 Maine Democratic presidential caucuses
 2008 Republican Party presidential primaries

References

External links

 Official website

Maine
Republican presidential caucuses
2008
February 2008 events in the United States